Fanfare for the Inauguration of John F. Kennedy is a 1961 composition by Leonard Bernstein.

A complete performance of the piece lasts from 30 seconds to a  minute. The fanfare received its premiere at John F. Kennedy's  pre-inaugural gala at the D.C. Armory in Washington, D.C. on 20 January 1961. Bernstein and Nelson Riddle conducted it at the inaugural gala, it was orchestrated by Sid Ramin.

The piece is orchestrated for a chamber ensemble consisting of a piccolo, flute, two oboes, two clarinets, three horns, four trumpets, four trombones, a timpani, snare drum, bass drum, and cymbals.

References

External links
 Fanfare for the Inauguration of John F Kennedy, Boosey & Hawkes
 Youtube - Gianandrea Noseda and the National Symphony Orchestra perform Fanfare for the Inauguration of JFK

1961 in American music
1961 in Washington, D.C.
Compositions for orchestra
1961 compositions
Works about John F. Kennedy